Soğuksu Nature Park, established in 2011, is a nature park in Eastern Anatolia Region of Turkey.

Geology
The area in and around of the nature park consists of basalt and dolomite rocks of Tertiary and Quaternary periods. Additionally, tuff, conglomerate and breccia are present.

Flora
The nature park features forest stand of Scots pine (Pinus sylvestris). In the areas between the forest stands, quaking aspen (Populus tremula) grow. Othercommon  plants are rose hip and buttercup (Ranunculus acris).

Climate
The climate in the park shows characteristics of harsh continental climate. Long lasting winters are snowy, frostyand very cold. In winter time, more precipitation falls than in the summer period. The highest precipitation occurs just before the summer begins.

References

Nature parks in Turkey
Sarıkamış District
Geography of Kars Province
Landforms of Kars Province
Tourist attractions in Kars Province
2011 establishments in Turkey
Protected areas established in 2011